Richard Bernard (1917–2012) was a Scottish international lawn bowler.

Bowls career
He won a silver medal in the singles at the 1972 World Outdoor Bowls Championship in Worthing. He also won a gold medal in the team event (Leonard Trophy).

He was National champion in 1970.

Personal life
He was a mining engineer by trade. He was a county billiards player before switching to bowls in 1948.  He died in 2012.

References

1917 births
2012 deaths
Scottish male bowls players